Jesuit Migrant Service, Mexico (SJM-Mexico) was founded by the Society of Jesus in 2001, to offer a variety of services for the many migrants passing into, through, or out of Mexico, and to their families.

Services 
SJM has offices in Tecozautla, Hidalgo, in Frontera Comalapa, Chiapas, and in Mexico City.

SJM's special assistance to separated families included a pastoral letter and the program "Women and the Migrant Family" in the Diocese of San Andrés Tuxtla, Veracruz, Mexico.

SJM was instrumental in organizing the Documentation of the Network of Organizations for the Defense of Migrants in 2013 and publishes the annual report.

References  

Jesuit development centres
Organizations established in 2001
Migration-related organizations
Christian refugee aid organizations
Organizations based in Mexico City